Eduard Riedl (born 20 August 1901, date of death unknown) was a Czech middle-distance runner. He competed in the men's 800 metres at the 1924 Summer Olympics.

References

External links
 

1901 births
Year of death missing
Athletes (track and field) at the 1924 Summer Olympics
Czech male middle-distance runners
Olympic athletes of Czechoslovakia
Place of birth missing